Theta Cassiopeiae or θ Cassiopeiae is a solitary star in the northern constellation of Cassiopeia. It shares the traditional name Marfak  with μ Cassiopeiae, positioned less than half a degree to the WSW, which is derived from the Arabic term Al Marfik or Al Mirfaq (المرفق), meaning "the elbow". At an apparent visual magnitude of 4.3, Theta Cassiopeiae is visible to the naked eye. Based upon an annual parallax shift of 24.42 mas, it is located about 134 light years from the Sun. It has a total annual proper motion of 0.227 arcseconds per year, and is slowly drifting further away from the Sun with a radial velocity of 2.5 km/s.

It is about 650 million years in age and is spinning with a projected rotational velocity of 103 km/s. This is a candidate Vega-type system, which means it displays an infrared excess suggesting it has an orbiting debris disk. It is a suspected Delta Scuti variable.

The star appears to be a member of a leading tidal tail of the Hyades cluster.

References

External links
</ref>

A-type main-sequence stars

Cassiopeia (constellation)
Cassiopeiae, Theta
Durchmusterung objects
Cassiopeiae, 33
006961
005542
0343
Marfak